Mary Anne Pecot de Boisblanc (1925-2015) was a self-taught American artist from Louisiana. She was best known for her paintings which depicted Cajun life and culture.

Biography
Born in 1925, Mary Anne de Boisblanc grew up in Labadieville, Louisiana. She first began painting her colorful pieces in the late 1960s, drawing on her memories of growing up in rural Louisiana and her own Cajun heritage. The artist described herself as a "Primitive Naive Acadian Artist." Her work is included in the collections of the West Baton Rouge Museum. Her archives are held in the collection of the Newcomb Center for Research on Women.

Mary Anne de Boisblanc died on December 17, 2015 at the age of 90.

See also
Folk Art
Outsider Art
Naïve art

Further reading
Mary Anne Pecot de Boisblanc: The Spirit of the Acadian Women. Acadian Memorial Foundation (2005).

References

External links

Artists from Louisiana
1925 births
2015 deaths
American women painters
21st-century American women